Science & Survival is the second studio album by New Zealand rock band I Am Giant. The album was released on 4 July 2014. The music video for the album's second single, (Death Of You), was shot at Kingseat Hospital.

Track listing

Charts

References

I Am Giant albums
2014 albums